Al-Hidd Sports and Cultural Club is a Bahraini football club based in Al Hidd, Muharraq Island. They currently compete in the top division of Bahraini football league. Also club have Futsal team, which plays in Bahrain Futsal League.

Achievements 
Bahraini Premier League: 2
2015–16, 2019–20
Bahraini King's Cup: 1
 2015

Bahraini FA Cup: 2
 2015, 2017

Bahraini Super Cup: 2
 2015, 2016

Bahraini Elite Cup : 1
 2018

Performance in international competitions

Performance in UAFA competitions
 UAFA Cup: 1 appearance
2012–13: Second Round

Performance in AFC competitions
 AFC Cup: 5 appearances'''
2014: Quarter-finals
2015: Group stage
2016: Group stage
2017: Group stage
2021: Group stage

External links
Hidd SCC at Goalzz

Hidd SCC
Football clubs in Bahrain
Association football clubs established in 1945
1945 establishments in Bahrain